The Walker Charcoal Kiln is a structure in the Prescott National Forest near the town of Walker, Arizona and situated in the vicinity of the abandoned Poland Junction Mine near the summit of Renegade Hill. It is listed on the National Register of Historic Places.  A sign posted near the kiln reads, "This kiln was constructed around 1880 by Jake and Joe Carmichael to convert oak wood into charcoal for use at nearby smelters. The surrounding forest was cut so heavily for charcoal and mine props in the late 1800s that it is just now becoming productive again." Locally, the kiln is referred to as "the Beehive".

See also
 Bradshaw Mountain Railroad

References

Industrial buildings completed in 1880
Industrial buildings and structures on the National Register of Historic Places in Arizona
Buildings and structures in Yavapai County, Arizona
1880 establishments in Arizona Territory
Prescott National Forest
Kilns
Charcoal ovens
National Register of Historic Places in Prescott, Arizona